Janko Tipsarević was the defending champion, but he withdrew because of an injury. 
Stanislas Wawrinka won the title, defeating Édouard Roger-Vasselin in the final, 7–5, 6–2. He did not lose a single set in the entire tournament.

Seeds
The top four seeds received a bye into the second round.

Draw

Finals

Top half

Bottom half

Qualifying

Seeds

Qualifiers

Qualifying draw

First qualifier

Second qualifier

Third qualifier

Fourth qualifier

References
 Main draw
 Qualifying draw

Singles